Alaskan parchment scrip was in circulation from 1816 to 1867, issued by the Russian-American Company (RAC) in the colony of Russian America. Also known as seal skin or walrus skin notes, this type of scrip was printed on parchment, and sometimes on walrus hide, in denominations of 10, 25, 50 kopecks and 1, 5, 10, and 25 rubles.

Russian-American Company currency

The Russian-American Company (RAC) (full name- "the Russian-American Company under the Protection of His Imperial Majesty") was chartered by Russian Tsar Paul I on 8 July 1799. This 20-year charter granted the RAC an exclusive monopoly for any and all produce from (primarily the fur trade) as well as the general administration of colonial Russian America. Each of the five main districts (New Archangel, Kodiak, Unalaska, Ross, and Northern Islands) housed a RAC store which only accepted company scrip and charged a 35% markup on basic commodities.
    
RAC employees and local native hunters were paid in company script redeemable only at company stores. Though first made of thick card stock, this scrip was later made from parchment and walrus hide.

Scrip Issues

In 1803 Alexander Andreyevich Baranov, one of the directors of the RAC, proposed the creation of a colonial currency for use in Russian America, to be printed on parchment for greater durability. The first issue of currency (12,000 rubles) did not arrive until 1816, and it was printed on a heavy card stock. A second issue arrived in 1822 printed on the same material. Given the climate of Alaska and constantly being outdoors, the currency did not survive long in circulation. Only four examples from the first two issues are known to exist: a 25 kopeck, 50 kopeck, and one ruble note from 1816 and a single one ruble note from 1822.

Constantly needing to replace damaged and worn notes, a third issue (on parchment) arrived in 1826 with higher denomination notes on color-tinted parchment (e.g., blue 5 ruble notes and red 10 ruble notes). Later issues (e.g., 1842, 1846, 1848) varied the ink overprint color for each denomination: 10 kopeck (brown), 25 kopeck (black), 50 kopeck (lilac), 1 ruble (green), 5 ruble (blue ink on blue-tinted parchment), 10 ruble (red ink on red-tinted parchment). The issue of 1852 changed the color scheme of the ruble notes: black ink on light yellow (1 ruble), black ink on blue (5 ruble), and black ink on red (10 ruble).

Lower denomination notes- 10, 25, and 50 kopeck notes were the same size (except for the one-issue round 10 kopeck note). In an attempt to help the largely illiterate native population of Russian America, these lower denomination notes were systematically altered: the 10 kopeck had two holes made, one in each of the upper corners, the 25 kopeck had all four corners clipped, and the 50 kopeck had the upper two corners clipped.

Census
Ted Uhl, a collector and researcher of Alaskan parchment scrip, reported that 53 notes were known in 1982. Zander's 1996 monograph published by The Russian Numismatic Society lists every reported note by denomination and serial number: 10 kopecks (22), 25 kopecks (18), 50 kopecks (10), one ruble (18), five rubles (3), 10 rubles (5), and 25 rubles (1) for a census total of 77. It is uncertain whether an accurate census is currently maintained, but some estimates suggest between 100 and 150 notes are known.

References

Footnotes

Notes

Bibliography

Further reading

Exonumia
Russian-American Company
Russian America
Colonial United States (Russian)